Harding Howell and Company's Grand Fashionable Magazine was an 18th-century department store at 89 Pall Mall in St James's, London. Open from 1796 to 1820, it could be considered a forerunner of the modern department store.

The shop was divided into four departments, selling fur and fans, fabric for dresses, haberdashery, jewelry and clocks, perfume and millinery.

References

Defunct department stores of the United Kingdom
Defunct retail companies of the United Kingdom
Buildings and structures in the City of Westminster
18th-century fashion
Clothing retailers of England
Clothing companies of England
1796 establishments in England
1820 disestablishments in England
British companies established in 1796
British companies disestablished in 1820